In India, the members of Parliament or State Legislative Assemblies that belong to a particular political party are known as the Legislative Party. For example, the Congress Party's legislators are known as the Congress Legislative Party or CLP. Traditionally, the head of the majority Legislative Party in Parliament is chosen as Prime Minister, and that of the majority Legislative Party in a State, the Chief Minister.

References

Politics of India
Political parties in India
Parliament of India